Lurudden is a locality situated in Ekerö Municipality, Stockholm County, Sweden with 205 inhabitants in 2010. It is located on the eastern part of the island Helgö.

References 

Populated places in Ekerö Municipality
Uppland